João Paulo Peixoto (born 11 March 1964) is a Portuguese businessman and an University teacher.

João Paulo Peixoto was the first Portuguese national to visit all the countries in the world. He finished his last country, Israel, on 11 August 2011.

João Paulo Peixoto is father of six children, in order, Raquel, João, Marta, Pedro, Inês and Isabella.

Traveling around the world he became known as "Paju".

References

External links
Official Facebook Page
TVI Interview (in Portuguese)
O economista que acabou o mundo - Jornal Publico FUGAS (in Portuguese)
Novos Descobridores Team João Paulo Peixoto Central Asia Rally 2012 Official Team Page (in English)
TSF Radio Interview (in Portuguese)

1964 births
Living people
People from Braga
Portuguese businesspeople